Salima Mourad or Salima Murad (2 February 1900 – 28 January 1974) was a well-known Iraqi Jewish singer and was well known and highly respected in the Arab world. She was given the nickname "Pasha" by the Iraqi Prime Minister Nuri al-Said.

Salima was dubbed by Umm Kulthum as the most famous woman singer, since the early 1930s. She was also the wife of a very successful Iraqi singer and actor, Nazem Al-Ghazali. Even after the bulk of Iraqi Jews left Iraq, Salima continued to live there until her death in 1974.

Despite the popularity of her music in the Arab world, her music only ever had a small following in Israel.

References

External links
 
 

1900 births
1974 deaths
People from Baghdad
Iraqi Jews
20th-century Iraqi women singers
Jewish singers